Cristian Gheorghe (born 10 September 1956) is a Romanian former football goalkeeper and manager.

International career
Cristian Gheorghe played 14 games for Romania's national team, including eight appearances  in qualifying matches for the 1978 and 1982 World Cups and Euro 1980.

Honours
Argeș Pitești
Divizia A: 1978–79
Gloria Bistrița
Divizia B: 1989–90

Notes

References

External links

1956 births
Living people
Romanian footballers
Romania international footballers
Association football goalkeepers
Liga I players
Liga II players
ACF Gloria Bistrița players
FC Sportul Studențesc București players
FC Argeș Pitești players
Romanian football managers
Footballers from Bucharest